In finance, a trading band is a range of prices for a commodity or currency, including:

 Currency trading band, a range of prices within which currency exchange rates are controlled
 Keltner channel, a technical indicator, a range of prices above or below a commodity's average price that may signal a changing trend
 Bollinger bands, another technical indicator, a range of prices above and below a commodity's average price that may signal a changing trend

References

Financial markets